The Meddler is a 1925 American silent Western film directed by Arthur Rosson and starring William Desmond, Gloria Roy, and Claire Anderson.

Plot
As described in a film magazine review, millionaire Richard Gilmore goes west to conquer his sense of fear. At his fiancée's instigation, he turns to polite banditry. He aids a starving widow and her children, frustrates some cattle rustlers, and even overcomes an honest rancher to convince him that his life is in danger. After he succeeds in saving the rancher and his sister, the rustlers are rounded up. He hears that his fiancée has married another, paving the way for his future happiness with the rancher's sister.

Cast

References

Bibliography
 Robert B. Connelly. The Silents: Silent Feature Films, 1910-36, Volume 40, Issue 2. December Press, 1998.

External links
 
 

1925 films
1925 Western (genre) films
American black-and-white films
Universal Pictures films
Films directed by Arthur Rosson
Silent American Western (genre) films
1920s English-language films
1920s American films